Telecommunications in France are highly developed. France is served by an extensive system of automatic telephone exchanges connected by modern networks of fiber-optic cable, coaxial cable, microwave radio relay, and a domestic satellite system; cellular telephone service is widely available, expanding rapidly, and includes roaming service to foreign countries.

Fixed-line telephony
The telephony system employs an extensive system of modern network elements such as digital telephone exchanges, mobile switching centres, media gateways and signalling gateways at the core, interconnected by a wide variety of transmission systems using fibre-optics or Microwave radio relay networks. The access network, which connects the subscriber to the core, is highly diversified with different copper-pair, optic-fibre and wireless technologies. The fixed-line telecommunications market is dominated by the former state-owned monopoly France Telecom.

Telephones – main lines in use: 36.441 million; 35.5 million (metropolitan France) (2009)

Telephones – mobile cellular: 60.95 million; 59.543 million (metropolitan France) (2009)

International connection
Satellite earth stations – 2 Intelsat (with total of 5 antennas – 2 for Indian Ocean and 3 for Atlantic Ocean), NA Eutelsat, 1 Inmarsat (Atlantic Ocean region); HF radiotelephone communications with more than 20 countries

Radio
Radio stations: AM 41, FM about 3,500 (this figure is an approximation and includes many repeaters), shortwave 2 (1998)

Radios: 55.3 million (1997)

Television

Television stations: 584 (plus 9,676 repeaters) (1995)

Televisions: 34.8 million (1997)

Internet

Internet country code: .fr

Internet service providers (ISPs): 62 (2000)

Internet hosts: 15,182,001; 15.161 million (metropolitan France) (2010)

Internet users: 45.262 million; 44.625 million (metropolitan France) (2009)

Mobile networks 
France currently has 4 mobile networks, Orange, SFR, Bouygues Telecom and Free all of which are licensed for UMTS. All except Free are also licensed for GSM. In 2016 Q3, Orange had 28.966 million mobile phone customers, SFR had 14.577 million, Bouygues had 12.660 million, Free Mobile had 12.385 million, and the MVNOs had 7.281 million.

Before the launch of Free Mobile in January 2012, the number of physical mobile phone operators was very limited. For example, Sweden currently has 4 licensed operators with their own networks despite a smaller and sparser population than France's, making improved coverage less economically rewarding. However, France has a number of MVNOs which increases competition.

However, Free Mobile obtained its licence in December 2009 and operates since January 2012.

In France, the satellite telecommunications system TELECOM 1 (TC1) will provide high-speed, broadband transfer of digital data between different sections of subscribing companies. Conventional telecommunications links between continental France and its overseas departments will also be supplied.

Overseas departments and regions
 Telecommunications in French Guiana
 Telecommunications in French Polynesia
 Telecommunications in Guadeloupe
 Telecommunications in New Caledonia
 Telecommunications in Saint Barthélemy
 Telecommunications in Saint Martin

See also

 France
 Media of France
 List of newspapers in France
 List of mobile network operators of Europe

References

External links 
 Communications in France – at Discover France (English)